The Bad Plus Joshua Redman is a 2015 album by jazz trio The Bad Plus and saxophonist Joshua Redman. The album was generally positively received, achieving a Metacritic score of 84%.

Background
The record is the group's eleventh studio album and the first one in collaboration with Joshua Redman. It only contains original compositions, except for "Dirty Blonde" and "Silence is the Question" which already appeared on previous albums.

Reception
Evan Haga of JazzTimes wrote " The album includes nine tracks, including two compositions apiece by Redman and pianist Ethan Iverson, four by bassist Reid Anderson (including two pieces previously recorded by TBP) and one by drummer Dave King. There are none of TBP’s calling-card deconstructions of pop hits, and you don’t miss them; the original music is excellent and wide-ranging and deftly arranged, in a way that underscores both the trio’s affinity for composition and the fresher, more noticeably improvised terrain that Redman’s presence opens up". Nate Chinen of The New York Times mentioned, "As a chemistry experiment, the album is a knockout."

Michael Ullman of The Arts Fuse wrote "One of the longest lasting small groups in jazz, The Bad Plus is also one of the most creatively satisfying. With the galvanic addition of Redman, the ensemble is now made up of four intense virtuosos whose musical intelligence is as impeccable as their instrumental chops. They write exquisitely crafted originals in a startling range of styles."

Jon Garelick of The Boston Globe mentioned "Having covered Black Sabbath’s “Iron Man,” Stravinsky’s “Rite of Spring,” and, most recently, Ornette Coleman’s epochal “Science Fiction,” piano trio the Bad Plus returns to its own intricate explorations of song form and improvisation". Mike Hobart of Financial Times commented, "Here, saxophonist Joshua Redman adds much-needed heft and brings the best out of drummer Dave King and pianist Ethan Iverson, transforming a somewhat derivative repertoire into an appealing personal statement."

Track listing

Personnel
Reid Anderson – bass
Ethan Iverson – piano
David King – drums
Joshua Redman – saxophone

References

External links
 

The Bad Plus albums
Joshua Redman albums
2015 albums
Nonesuch Records albums